("A Hunter from the Palatinate") is a German folk song.  It celebrates a hunter freely riding across the land and hunting, and is traditionally associated with the Soonwald forest and the Hunsrück uplands of the Palatinate (Kurpfalz).  The later stanzas feature somewhat crude sexual exploits of the hunter; modern songbooks, especially those used by children, usually remove stanzas 3, 4, and 5.  The base melody has been used and remixed in a variety of ways, from military marches to pleasant public event themes.

Creation
Both the author of the lyrics and the composer of the melody are unknown. The earliest known written reference to the song is from 1794, but music historians have speculated the song was created earlier than that and passed around orally and informally. Ludwig Erk suggested the song was created in 1763; Franz Magnus Böhme speculated it came from even earlier, at the dawn of the 18th century during the cultural height of German hunting.

Identity of the hunter

Various people have been suggested to be the hunter that is the subject of the song. In the tradition that suggests Utsch was the subject, the original creator of the lyrics was Martinus Klein, a Carmelite monk. Another proposal is John Casimir of the Palatinate-Simmern (German: Johann Kasimir), although this would imply a very early date for the creation of the song as John Casimir lived in the 16th century. Other prospects include , who served as forester of the Soonwald from 1719 to 1757 before Utsch, and Charles Theodore, Elector of Bavaria (German: Karl Theodor), who was Count Palatine of the Rhine from 1777–1799 and was known to both enjoy hunting and to have fathered a number of extramarital children. Charles Theodore was also a member of the Order of Saint Hubert, which would fit with the "Hubertus" lyric in the third stanza; Hubertus was the patron saint of hunting.

Lyrics

The references to the cuckoo in stanza 6 are referring to the baby's cry as a result of the hunter's affair in stanzas 3–5; in variants that cut those stanzas, it is just an abstract event that will never happen, meaning the hunter will stay hunting.

Adaptations and appearances
 The tune is well-known, and other songs have been written with new lyrics that often reference or parody the original lyrics.  The 1844 song "Das Erwachte Bewusstsein" ("The Awoken Consciousness") by August Heinrich Hoffmann von Fallersleben is set to the melody of "Kurpfalz".  It jokingly references the political turbulence of the era that would lead to the German revolutions of 1848–1849, with a refrain that mockingly celebrates the happiness of the government that has citizens who sit around doing nothing at pubs (instead of celebrating hunting).
 Karl Immermann wrote the novel Der Oberhof in 1840, a novel set in Westphalia in the Palatinate.
 The 1925 opera Wozzeck by Alban Berg includes the song in a tavern scene.
 A minor 1933 German film, The Hunter from Kurpfalz, is loosely  based on the story.
 The comedian Loriot drew an exaggerated version of the Hunter from Kurpfalz as a mascot for the 1975 Bundesgartenschau, a horticulture show.
 The politician Helmut Kohl played the song as a theme song at many of his public events, such as while campaigning or performing town halls.  Kohl came from Ludwigshafen in Rhineland-Palatinate, the modern West German state to the old Electorate of the Palatinate.
 The song appears in the 2017 video game Civilization VI.

References

External links

 Ein Jäger aus Kurpfalz 
 Ein Jäger aus Kurpfalz im Liederprojekt von Carus-Verlag und SWR2.

German folk songs
18th-century songs
Electoral Palatinate
Hunsrück
Hunting in popular culture